In complex analysis, functional analysis and operator theory, a Bergman space, named after Stefan Bergman, is a function space of holomorphic functions in a domain D of the complex plane that are sufficiently well-behaved at the boundary that they are absolutely integrable.

The quantity  is called the norm of the function ; it is a true norm if . Thus  is the subspace of holomorphic functions that are in the space Lp(D). The Bergman spaces are Banach spaces, which is a consequence of the estimate, valid on compact subsets K of D:

Thus convergence of a sequence of holomorphic functions in  implies also compact convergence, and so the limit function is also holomorphic.

If , then  is a reproducing kernel Hilbert space, whose kernel is given by the Bergman kernel.

Special cases and generalisations

If the domain  is bounded, then the norm is often given by

where  is a normalised Lebesgue measure of the complex plane, i.e. .
The Bergman space is usually defined on the open unit disk  of the complex plane, in which case . In the Hilbert space case, given , we have

that is,  is isometrically isomorphic to the weighted ℓp(1/(n+1)) space. Similarly, if , the right (or the upper) complex half-plane, then

where , that is,  is isometrically isomorphic to the weighted Lp1/t (0,∞) space (via the Laplace transform).

The weighted Bergman space  is defined in an analogous way, i.e.

provided that  is chosen in such way, that  is a Banach space (or a Hilbert space, if ). In case where , by a weighted Bergman space  we mean the space of all analytic functions  such that

and similarly on the right half-plane (i.e. ) we have

and this space is isometrically isomorphic, via the Laplace transform, to the space , where

(here  denotes the Gamma function).

Further generalisations are sometimes considered, for example  denotes a weighted Bergman space (often called a Zen space) with respect to a translation-invariant positive regular Borel measure  on the closed right complex half-plane , that is

Reproducing kernels

and similarly for  we have

.

In general, if  maps a domain  conformally onto a domain , then

In weighted case we have

and

References

Further reading 

.

See also

Bergman kernel
Banach space
Hilbert space
Reproducing kernel Hilbert space
Hardy space
Dirichlet space

Complex analysis
Functional analysis
Operator theory